Muamer Svraka (born 14 February 1988) is a Bosnian professional footballer who plays as a midfielder for Zvijezda 09.

Club career
Svraka started his career in his hometown club Željezničar. He played for the youth selections of that club until the summer of 2008 when he was promoted, at age 20, to the first team of Željezničar. In his first season, 2008–09, he played six games in the first half-season for Željezničar and, in the second half-season, he played three matches for Travnik, where he was loaned. After returning from the loan, before the start of the 2009–10 season, he became one of the most standard players for Željezničar.

In 2014, Svraka left Željezničar after six years, winning the Bosnian Premier League three times and the Bosnian Cup two times during that period. After leaving Željezničar, he signed a contract with Indonesian club Paykan. After a year in Indonesia, Svraka became the new player of Croatian club Istra 1961.

In 2016, Svraka signed with Indonesia Soccer Championship club Semen Padang. He then came back to Bosnia and Herzegovina and joined Olimpik. After a half of a year he signed for another Croatian club Rudeš. In January 2018, Svraka became the new player of Estonian club Levadia. With Leavdia he won the Estonian Cup and Estonian Supercup.

On 31 December 2018, he left Levadia and signed with Maltese Premier League club Birkirkara While at Birkirkara, on 2 February 2019, Svraka was loaned out to Slovenian PrvaLiga club Triglav Kranj for the remainder of the season. After returning from his loan at Triglav to Birkikara, Svraka had to leave the club in July 2019 after his contract with Birkikara expired. In January 2020, he joined Kosovo Superleague club Gjilani.

On 15 September 2020, Svraka returned to the Bosnian Premier League, signing a contract until the end of the 2020–21 season with Krupa. He made his official debut for Krupa four days later, on 19 September, in a league match against his former club Željezničar. Only three months after joining Krupa, Svraka terminated his contract with the club on 21 December 2020. He joined Zvijezda 09 in February 2021.

International career
Svraka played for the Bosnia and Herzegovina national football team between 2012 and 2013. He played in six games (5 official) and scored two goals.

He got his international debut for Bosnia and Herzegovina on 31 May 2012, in a friendly match against Mexico on Soldier Field in Chicago, which Bosnia and Herzegovina lost 2–1 in the dying minutes of the match.

He scored his first international goal on 14 November 2012, in a 1–0 away win in another friendly game, this time against Algeria. His final international was a February 2013 friendly match away against Slovenia.

Career statistics

International goals
Scores and results list Bosnia and Herzegovina's goal tally first.

Honours
Željezničar
Bosnian Premier League: 2009–10, 2011–12, 2012–13
Bosnian Cup: 2010–11, 2011–12

Levadia
Estonian Cup: 2017–18
Estonian Supercup: 2018

References

External links

Muamer Svraka at Sofascore

1988 births
Living people
Footballers from Sarajevo
Bosniaks of Bosnia and Herzegovina
Association football midfielders
Bosnia and Herzegovina footballers
Bosnia and Herzegovina international footballers
FK Željezničar Sarajevo players
NK Travnik players
Paykan F.C. players
NK Istra 1961 players
Semen Padang F.C. players
FK Olimpik players
NK Rudeš players
FCI Levadia Tallinn players
Birkirkara F.C. players
NK Triglav Kranj players
SC Gjilani players
FK Krupa players
FK Zvijezda 09 players
Premier League of Bosnia and Herzegovina players
Persian Gulf Pro League players
Croatian Football League players
Liga 1 (Indonesia) players
Meistriliiga players
Slovenian PrvaLiga players
Football Superleague of Kosovo players
First League of the Republika Srpska players
Bosnia and Herzegovina expatriate footballers
Expatriate footballers in Iran
Bosnia and Herzegovina expatriate sportspeople in Iran
Expatriate footballers in Croatia
Bosnia and Herzegovina expatriate sportspeople in Croatia
Expatriate footballers in Indonesia
Bosnia and Herzegovina expatriate sportspeople in Indonesia
Expatriate footballers in Estonia
Bosnia and Herzegovina expatriate sportspeople in Estonia
Expatriate footballers in Malta
Bosnia and Herzegovina expatriate sportspeople in Malta
Expatriate footballers in Slovenia
Bosnia and Herzegovina expatriate sportspeople in Slovenia
Expatriate footballers in Kosovo
Bosnia and Herzegovina expatriate sportspeople in Kosovo